John W. Davis may refer to:

 John W. Davis (1873–1955), Democratic U.S. presidential candidate, 1924
 John W. Davis (governor) (1826–1907), Governor of Rhode Island
 John W. Davis (New Jersey politician) (1918–2003), Speaker of the New Jersey General Assembly.
 John Warren Davis (judge) (1867–1945), NJ State legislator and judge, Third Circuit Court of Appeals
 John Warren Davis (1888–1980), African American educator, college administrator, and civil rights leader
 John Wesley Davis (1799–1859), U.S. Representative from Indiana, Commissioner to China, Governor of Oregon Territory
 John William Davis (Georgia politician) (1916–1992), lawyer and U.S. Representative from Georgia
 John Davis (footballer) (middle name William), English footballer

See also
 John Davis (disambiguation)